Zhang Jingsheng (1888–1970) was a Chinese intellectual, aesthetician, author, and sexologist. He is remembered as one of the first academics in Chinese history to openly discuss sex. He is known as China's "Dr Sex."

Family and early life
Zhang Jingsheng was born into a poor family in Raoping County, Guangdong Province in 1888.

From 1912 to 1920 he studied in France earning a bachelor's degree in liberal arts and a PhD in Philosophy from the University of Lyon.

Career
After returning to China from France he taught at the Shantou Jinshan Middle School in Guangdong. In 1921 he was offered a teaching position at Peking University by Cai Yuanpei which put him at the very heart of the May Fourth movement.

Much of his work, both academic and professional, was regarded as tawdry or profane by Chinese conservatives and these forces were particularly powerful in Beijing. Zhang Jingsheng came under such fierce personal and professional attack that he attempted suicide by poison in 1932.

Over the course of his career he published books on science, medicine, philosophy, agronomy, logic, sociology, and literature. Zhang Jingsheng's translation of Jean-Jacques Rousseau’s Confessions was one of the most popular translations of its time in China.

Published works
 Sexual history (1926)

Biographies
 Sex, Eugenics, Aesthetics, Utopia in the Life and Work of Zhang Jingsheng (1888-1970) by Leon Antonio Rocha, 2010.

References

University of Lyon alumni
Chinese sexologists
1888 births
1970 deaths
Imperial University of Peking alumni